Nicolò Pozzebon (born 3 May 1997) is an Italian football player. He plays for Arzachena.

Club career
He made his Serie B debut for Perugia on 18 October 2014 in a game against Virtus Lanciano.

For the 2019–20 season, he joined Arzachena in Serie D.

References

External links
 

1997 births
Sportspeople from the Province of Treviso
Footballers from Veneto
Living people
Italian footballers
A.C. Perugia Calcio players
FC Groningen players
Juventus Next Gen players
Piacenza Calcio 1919 players
Arzachena Academy Costa Smeralda players
Serie B players
Serie C players
Italian expatriate footballers
Expatriate footballers in the Netherlands
Association football forwards